The following is a list of notable alumni of Taft School. The Taft School is a private, coeducational prep school located in Watertown, Connecticut, United States. The school was founded by Horace Dutton Taft, the brother of President William Howard Taft, in 1890.

Academics

T. H. Breen '60, Guggenheim fellow, history professor
Stevan Dedijer '30, founder of the Research Policy Institute, pioneer of Business Intelligence
Alfred G. Gilman '58, Nobel laureate in Physiology or Medicine
Mason Gross '29, President of Rutgers University
Thomas Kuhn '40, philosopher of science, author
Samuel T. Orton 1897, pioneer in the study of dyslexia
Rollin G. Osterweis '26, Professor of history at Yale University

Arts and entertainment

Trey Anastasio '83, Phish lead guitarist
Jeff Baxter '67, musician (Steely Dan, Doobie Brothers)
Henry Beard '63, co-founder of National Lampoon, co-author of Bored of the Rings
Peter Berg '80, actor/director of Friday Night Lights, Lone Survivor
 Jason Blum '87, producer of "Get Out" and "Paranormal Activity", founder of Blumhouse Productions
Mia Borders, '05, singer-songwriter
Mary Chapin Carpenter '76, five-time Grammy Award winner
Spencer Treat Clark '05, actor in Gladiator, Mystic River, Unbreakable, and The Last House on the Left
Barnaby Conrad '40, author, artist, bullfighter
Barnaby Conrad III '71, author and artist
Dominique Dunne, actress
Adam Duritz '82, lead singer of Counting Crows
James Franciscus '53, actor in The Naked City, Longstreet
Grant Goodeve, actor in Eight is Enough
Geoffrey T. Hellman '24, longtime New Yorker columnist
Deane G. Keller '17, painter and educator
Alan Klingenstein '72, film producer
Ralph Lee '53, Guggenheim fellow and Obie Award winner
Lorenzo Mariani '73, international opera director
Steve Sandvoss '98, actor
Tom Santopietro '72, author and Broadway theater manager
Fred Small '70, singer-songwriter
Dudley Taft '84, member of Sweet Water guitars, vocals
Karen L. Thorson '78, producer of The Wire, The Unusuals
Quincy Morgan '19, artist, daughter of John Adams Morgan of the Morgan Family and Sonja Morgan from The Real Housewives of New York City

Business

Thomas Ludlow Chrystie II '51, investment banker, first CFO of Merrill, Lynch & Company and inventor of the Cash Management Account
Peter S. Kaufman '71, investment banker, president of the Gordian Group LLC
Joseph Irwin Miller '27, industrialist, Cummins Engine Company
John M. Schiff '21, investment banker, philanthropist, honorary chairman of Lehman Brothers
 John G. Taft '68,  financier and writer
George Weyerhaeuser '44, chairman and CEO, Weyerhaeuser Company

Government officials

William D. Brewer, U.S. Ambassador 
Nathaniel Neiman Craley, Jr. '46, U.S. Congressman from Pennsylvania
Richard Funkhouser, U.S. Ambassador to Gabon
Robert C. Hill '38, United States Ambassador to Costa Rica, El Salvador, Mexico, Spain and Argentina
William S. Mailliard '35, U.S. Congressman, California
Manuel Rocha '69, United States Ambassador to Bolivia 2000-02
Earl E. T. Smith '22, United States Ambassador to Cuba (1958–59)
Michael P. W. Stone '42, U.S. Secretary of the Army
Bob Taft '59, Governor of Ohio
Robert A. Taft 1906, U.S. Senator from Ohio 1939–53, majority leader
Robert Taft, Jr. '35, Republican Congressman 1963–65, 1967–71, Senator 1971-76
William Howard Taft III '33, United States Ambassador to Ireland
Robert F. Wagner Jr. '29, Mayor of New York
John S. Wold '34, U.S. Congressman, Wyoming

Legal and judiciary

Flemming L. Norcott, Jr. '61, Associate Justice of the Connecticut Supreme Court
Robert W. Sweet '40, federal judge who heard New York Times v. Gonzales  concerning the Judith Miller controversy
Ralph K. Winter Jr. '53, federal judge for the United States Court of Appeals for the Second Circuit, nominated to the court in 1981 by President Ronald Reagan
Wesley S. Williams Jr., first African-American to serve both as legal counsel to the United States Senate and president of the Harvard Law School Association

Sports

Darren Bragg '87, professional baseball player
James Driscoll '96, professional golfer
Patrick Kerney '95, professional football player
Allison Mleczko '93, gold medalist in first women's Olympic ice hockey game at Nagano; silver medalist in 2002
Max Pacioretty '07, professional hockey player for the Vegas Golden Knights
Barbara Potter '79, Hall of Fame professional tennis player
James Stillman Rockefeller 1920, Olympic gold medalist, 8-man rowing (Paris, France)
Ryan Shannon '01, professional hockey player
Tammy Lee Shewchuk '96, Olympic gold medalist in women's ice hockey, Salt Lake City
Jaime Sifers '02, professional ice hockey player
Katey Stone '84, head coach of 2014 Olympic Team USA women's ice hockey team, coach of Harvard Crimson women's ice hockey team
John Welchli '46, Olympic silver medalist, Melbourne, 1956

Writing, journalism, and publishing

Laurence Bergreen '67, historian and biographer
Nelson Denis '72, journalist, screenwriter, former New York State Assemblyman
Steven J. Erlanger ’70, London bureau chief (formerly Paris and Jerusalem bureau chief) for The New York Times
Philip K. Howard '66, founder of Common Good, author of The Death of Common Sense: How Law is Suffocating America
Thomas Kuhn '40, author of Structure of Scientific Revolutions, coined the phrase "paradigm shift"
John Merrow ’59, Peabody Award-winning journalist and producer
Sumner Chilton Powell '42, Pulitzer Prize winner in history for Puritan Village: The Formation of a New England Town 
Josh Quittner '75, author, editor of Business 2.0
David Kenyon Webster '40, soldier, journalist, and author
James Fenimore Cooper, Junior 1909, author, soldier

References

Taft School alumni
Taft School alumni